Sergey Stanislavovich Govorukhin (September 1, 1961 in Kharkiv – October 27, 2011 in Moscow) was a Russian film director, screenwriter, producer and writer.

Biography 
Sergey Govorukhin was born on September 1, 1961 in Kharkov in the family of well-known director Stanislav Govorukhin and actress Yunona Kareva. He spent his childhood and adolescence in the city of Kazan. In 1988 he graduated from the scriptwriting faculty of VGIK. He worked as a welder, fitter, builder of the Far North and a superintendent.

From 1994 to 2005, as a war correspondent, he took part in the fighting on the territories of Tajikistan, Chechnya, Afghanistan and Yugoslavia. He participated in 20 combat and three special operations. He was awarded several military decorations.

In 1994 he started shooting a film about modern warfare in Russia. In February 1995 in Grozny, while returning from the shooting, he was shot by Chechen fighters, which led to the amputation of his leg. His first artistic and journalistic film Damned and Forgotten in collaboration with Inna Vaneeva.

In 1996 he created the Regional public organization of disabled veterans of inter-regional conflicts in Tajikistan and Chechnya. He held the post of chairman of the veterans and the disabled fund armed conflict Rokada.

He was a member of the Writers' Union and the Union of Cinematographers of Russia. Leader of the Film Company Epilogue. He was also a member of the Presidential Council for Civil Society Institutions and Human Rights.

Author collections of prose Footy Мainland, No Оone Вut Us..., With me or Without Мe, Transparent Forest Under Luxembourg, a number of publications in the national press and magazines.

Death 
He died on October 27, 2011 at the age of 50 years. The cause of death was a stroke, which after a few days left Govorukhin comatose. He was buried on October 29 Troyekurovskoye Cemetery in Moscow.

Awards 
 Order of Courage (1995)
 Medal "In Commemoration of the 850th Anniversary of Moscow" (1997)
 Medal "For Courage" (1998)
 Nika Award (1999) – for the best non-fiction film
 Prize of the Guild of Russian filmmakers (2008)

References

External links

 Сайт памяти Сергея Станиславовича Говорухина.
 Книга, по которой Сергей Говорухин, планировал снять фильм, но не успел.
 Сергей Говорухин в Энциклопедии Отечественного кино.
 СВОЯ ВЕРТИКАЛЬ СЕРГЕЯ ГОВОРУХИНА. – Газета "Новая Неделя", выпуск от 29 ноября 2013 г. 

1961 births
2011 deaths
Film people from Kharkiv
Russian film directors
Russian screenwriters
Male screenwriters
Russian male writers
Gerasimov Institute of Cinematography alumni
Recipients of the Order of Courage
Burials in Troyekurovskoye Cemetery